Acetoguanamine is an organic compound with the chemical formula (CNH2)2CCH3N3.  It is related to melamine but with one amino group replaced by methyl. Acetoguanamine is used in the manufacturing of melamine resins.  Unlike melamine ((CNH2)3N3), acetoguanamine is not a crosslinker.  The "aceto" prefix is historical, the compound does not contain an acetyl group. A related compound is benzoguanamine.

The compound is prepared by condensation of cyanoguanidine with acetonitrile:
(H2N)2C=NCN  +  MeCN   →  (CNH2)2(CMe)N3

Safety
LD50 (oral, rats) is 2740 mg/kg.

References 

Triazines